Camaná is the district capital of Camaná Province in Arequipa, Peru.

Camana may also refer to:

Peru
 Camaná Province
 Camaná District
 Camaná River or Colca River
 Camana language, an unclassified language

Other uses
 Cămana River, a river in Romania
 Camana Rock, in Stromness Bay, South Georgia

See also
 
 Camañas, municipality in Teruel, Aragon, Spain
 Camanaú River, a river in Amazonas, Brazil